Peter Chak-cheong Wong, CBE, JP (19September 192222September 1989) was a member of the Executive Council and Legislative Council of Hong Kong and president of the Law Society of Hong Kong. Born in Hong Kong, Wong attended the University of Hong Kong and graduated with bachelor's degree in 1950. He became a solicitor and a fellow of the British Institute of Management. He was the president of the Law Society between 1973 and 1975. He was appointed by Governor Murray MacLehose to the Legislative Council when the council was reformed and extended its membership from 15 to 22 unofficial members. He was subsequently the member of the Executive Council from 1978 to 1983.

References

1922 births
1989 deaths
Solicitors of Hong Kong
Members of the Executive Council of Hong Kong
Commanders of the Order of the British Empire
Alumni of the University of Hong Kong
HK LegCo Members 1985–1988
Hong Kong Buddhists